WOSA (101.1 FM) is a non-commercial educational radio station licensed to Grove City, Ohio, featuring a classical music format known as "Classical 101fm". Owned by the Ohio State University,  the station serves Columbus, Ohio and much of the surrounding Columbus metro area, extending its reach into Mansfield, Marion and Southern Ohio with four full-power repeaters. The WOSA studios are located at the Fawcett Center on the Ohio State University campus, while the station transmitter resides off of Borror Road in Lockbourne. In addition to a standard analog transmission, WOSA is available online. It is one of a few non-commercial stations in the United States to broadcast outside of its recommended frequency range (88-92 MHz).

History

WWCD (1990–2010)

WWCD began broadcasting on August 21, 1990. The first song played on the station was "Hello, Hello, Hello, Hello, Hello, (Petrol)" by the Dublin, Ireland band Something Happens. The station was long owned by Fun With Radio, LLC., whose founder, Roger Vaughn, purchased the station from Video Services in 1992. WWCD and its successor station, WWCD (102.5 FM), has always been either owned or operated by interests in metro Columbus, and is one of the few remaining independent radio stations in the U.S. playing alternative rock.

WWCD also lays claim to being one of the first stations in the United States to be simulcast and on Internet radio. In a March 2006 Radio & Records list of the top 20 alternative rock radio stations in the United States, WWCD was ranked #4 in the country and #1 east of the Mississippi River.

WWCD's longtime program director throughout the late 1990s and 2000s was afternoon DJ Andy "Andyman" Davis. With the station almost since its inception, Davis previously served as the station's music director. Davis died of a suspected heart attack while on vacation in Michigan with his family on July 18, 2010. The annual "Andyman-a-Thon" also continues in his name.

2010 "frequency shift"
Ohio State University, under licensee WOSU Public Media, announced a $4.8 million purchase of WWCD from Fun With Radio, LLC. on June 30, 2010. At the same time, Fun With Radio entered into a local marketing agreement with the WHIZ Media Group to take over programming on WCVZ (102.5 FM) in Baltimore immediately, with a future option for purchase. Although generally reported and regarded as a "frequency shift" for WWCD, Fun With Radio took over programming and operations of WCVZ; changed the station's format from country to alternative as a direct simulcast of WWCD; and rebranded the station as "CD101 @ 102.5".

The purchase of the original WWCD was consummated that December 14. WOSU Public Media then changed WWCD's callsign to WOSA; changed the station's format to classical music; and rebranded the station as "Classical 101fm". Concurrently, WCVZ's callsign was changed to WWCD.

WOSA (2010–present)
WOSA's roots date back to WOSU-FM's long history as a classical outlet, airing the format on a full-time basis from 1980 until 2008 as a complement to WOSU, which would air more traditional public radio fare. Starting on January 14, 2008, WOSU-FM switched to a mixed news/classical format, introducing NPR news magazines during morning and evening drive-times along with assorted NPR and PRI weekend programs.  Many of these programs were simulcast with its AM sister station WOSU, which still programmed a separate news/talk format. As a result, WOSU established a 24-hour all classical music service on its HD-2 HD Radio stream and on its web site.

Upon WOSA's establishment, it assumed WOSU-FM's 24-hour HD-2 and internet-only all classical music service on a full-time basis, operating as a non-commercial station. In addition, WOSU-FM's format changed to news/talk as a simulcast with WOSU (subsequently divested). WOSU also converted four repeater stations for WOSU-FM—WOSB in Marion, WOSE in Coshocton, WOSP in Portsmouth and WOSV in Mansfield—to repeaters of WOSA. In particular, WOSB and WOSV serve areas north of Columbus that are not served well by the new 101.1 frequency.

Programming

Repeaters
WOSA also extends its signal via full-power satellites WOSE Coshocton (91.1 FM), WOSB Marion (91.1 FM), WOSP Portsmouth (91.5 FM), and WOSV Mansfield (91.7 FM).

See also
WOSU-FM
WVSG - the former WOSU
WOSU-TV

References

External links

 Repeaters
 
 
 
 

Classical music radio stations in the United States
Radio stations established in 2010
Ohio State Buckeyes media
Ohio State University
OSA
OSA
NPR member stations
OSA